VeriFace is an online service for remote identity verification of customers developed by Slovak company Rokan Biometrics. It aims to provide biometric identity verification and customer onboarding via facial recognition software.

The service was launched in 2021 and is primarily used in the financial sector. VeriFace can be used when it is necessary to verify the identity of customers remotely according to the Anti-money laundering act.

VeriFace operates using biometrics and Optical Character Recognition. OCR is used convert text from images of physical documents into a digital format. Facial recognition technology is used to compare the face from the photo on the document with the photo of the customer's face obtained during the verification process. Biometric services are provided by the Slovak company Innovatrics.

References 

Facial recognition software
Biometrics software